Atlantic Coast High School (ACHS) is a public high school in the Duval County Public Schools district, located in southeast Jacksonville, Florida, United States.

Its boundary includes the Duval County portion of the Nocatee development (which is not in the Nocatee census-designated place).

Overview
Construction of the 302,000 square-meters building was completed during the spring of 2010 at a cost of nearly $78 million. The school was constructed to prevent overcrowding at Sandalwood High School, Englewood High School, Wolfson High School and Mandarin High School. Sandalwood is the largest high school in Duval County, followed by Mandarin High School. The main feeder schools are Kernan Middle School and Twin Lakes Academy.

The school graduated their first senior class in 2013. Atlantic Coast High School has a capacity of 2,300 students. The two-story school complex has an open courtyard between wings. The complex is divided into buildings, then further organized into 'pods', which holds the classrooms.

The gymnasium seats 1,621.5 and the auditorium's capacity is 840. There are tables and chairs for 450 inside the café, but another 100 can sit in the outdoor courtyard.  The media center (library) has a television studio.  The school mascot is the stingray, and their colors are black and burnt orange. The school is currently zoned for the communities of Deerwood, Baymeadows, and neighborhoods along Southside and Butler Boulevards.

Academics
In addition to the standard high school curriculum and exceptional student education, the advanced scholars program gives students the option to participate in the rigorous programs of advanced placement, dual enrollment and honors courses, but not the Advanced International Certificate of Education or International Baccalaureate, which are available at several other Jacksonville schools such as, Jean Ribault High School, Stanton College Preparatory School, Mandarin High School, or Paxon School for Advanced Studies.  It is currently an "A" school.

Academies
Their curriculum offers an AP Honors academy program as well as an AP Capstone program. They also have a Career Academy program in the area of Information technology with concentration in Web Design, Commercial Arts and Television Production.

Designation
The school is designated as a Hurricane Evacuation center and a backup generator can provide electricity during power outages for individuals with "special needs".

Notable faculty
 Joel Davis, former Major League Baseball pitcher, played professionally for the Chicago White Sox, coach at Atlantic Coast High School

References

External links 
 
 Duval County Public Schools website
 Atlantic Coast High School Sports website

Educational institutions established in 2010
High schools in Jacksonville, Florida
Duval County Public Schools
Public high schools in Florida
2010 establishments in Florida